Lobelia angulata, previously known as Pratia angulata, and commonly known as pānakenake, is a small herbaceous scrambling herb native to New Zealand.

References

Flora of New Zealand
angulata